Misty is a 2018 South Korean television series starring Kim Nam-joo and Ji Jin-hee. The series marks Kim Nam-joo's small screen comeback after six years. It aired on JTBC's Fridays and Saturdays at 23:00 (KST) time slot from February 2 to March 24, 2018.

Synopsis
Go Hye-ran (Kim Nam-joo) becomes the prime suspect in a murder case. Her husband Kang Tae-wook (Ji Jin-hee) ends up being her legal counsel despite their marriage being on the rocks.

Cast

Main
 Kim Nam-joo as Go Hye-ran, a skilled and popular anchorwoman.
  as young Go Hye-ran
 Ji Jin-hee as Kang Tae-wook, a former prosecutor but is now working as a public defender.
 Jeon Hye-jin as Seo Eun-joo, Kevin Lee's wife and Hye-ran's friend from school.
 Im Tae-kyung as Ha Myung-woo, a prisoner.
 Seo Ji-hoon as young Ha Myung-woo
 Go Jun as Lee Jae-yeong / Kevin Lee, a pro-golfer and Seo Eun-joo's husband.
 Jin Ki-joo as Han Ji-won, junior anchorwoman and Hye-ran's rival.
 Ahn Nae-sang as Kang Ki-joon, a detective.

Supporting

People at JBC
 Lee Geung-young as Jang Gyu-seok, JBC news director.
 Lee Sung-wook as Oh Dae-woong
 Koo Ja-sung as Kwak Gi-seok, a junior reporter.
 Lee Ah-hyun as Lee Yun-jung

Extended

  as Prosecutor Byun Woo-hyun
 Lee Jun-hyeok as Jung Ki-chan
 Kim Soo-jin as Yoon Song-yi, Hye-ran's best friend and magazine reporter.
  as Choi Ki-seop
 Shin Kang-woo as Park Sung-jae
  as Tae-wook's father
 Kim Bo-yeon as Tae-wook's mother
  as Lee Young-shil, Hye-ran's mother.
  as Baek Dong-hyun, Kevin Lee's manager.
 Kim Bum-soo as Kim Bum-soo, winner of journalist of the year award.
  as Han Ki-hoon
 
 Myung Ji-yun
 Goo Bon-seok
  as Senior Go
 Yang Dae-hyuk as Floor Director
 
 Yang Hee-myung
 Seo Byung-deok
 Lee Do-hyun
 Lee Tae-hyun
 Oh Joo-hwan
 Lee Do-yoon
 Jo Soo-hyuk
 Go Man-kyoo
 Kim Kwang-tae
  as Kyoo Do-kwan
 
 Ha Eun
  as Yoon Ho-young
 Jun Eun-hye
 Lee Joo-seok
 
 
 
  as Kang In-han
 Kim Myung-gon as Jung Dae-han
 
 
 Lee Tae-ho
 
 
 Hwang In-joon
 Min Dae-shik
 Kang Chan-yang
 Han Joong-ki
 Choi Seung-il
 
 Shin Sun-hee
 
 Park So-yeon
 
 Kim Joon-hee
 Hae Sun
 Lee Se-wook
 Kang Choong-hoon
 Jin Soo-nam
 Yook Hyo-myung
 Oh Seung-chan
 
 Kang Hoo-jae
 Song Hyun-jin
 Sun Hyun-jin
 Sun Ah-rin
 Lim Jung-min
 Lee Jin-seung
 Jung Hyun-woo
 Lee Kwan-young
 Lim Yong-soon
 
 Kim Wang-do

Special appearances
 Han Suk-joon
 
 Choo Ja-hyun

Production
 The series marks musical actor Im Tae-kyung small screen debut.
 The first script reading of the cast was held in October 2017 at JTBC building in Sangam-dong.
 Filming started in South Korea in October 2017. The staff and main actors then departed for Thailand in November for one week filming.
 Misty was rated 19 for the first 4 episodes by the Korea Communications Commission due to violence and sexual content. However, the rating was changed to rated 15 starting on episode 5.

Original soundtrack

Part 1

Part 2

Part 3

Part 4

Part 5

Special OST

Viewership

Awards and nominations

References

External links
  
 
 

Korean-language television shows
JTBC television dramas
2018 South Korean television series debuts
South Korean legal television series
South Korean thriller television series
South Korean melodrama television series
South Korean romance television series
2018 South Korean television series endings
Television series by Story & Pictures Media